Paul Benjamin Mendelsohn (born 3 April 1969) is an Australian actor. He first rose to prominence in Australia for his breakout role in The Year My Voice Broke (1987) and since then he has had roles in films such as Animal Kingdom (2010), The Dark Knight Rises (2012), Starred Up (2013), Mississippi Grind (2015), Rogue One (2016), Darkest Hour (2017) and Steven Spielberg's Ready Player One (2018). Mendelsohn starred in the Netflix original series Bloodline (2015–2017), for which he won the Primetime Emmy Award for Outstanding Supporting Actor in a Drama Series in 2016.

He joined the Marvel Cinematic Universe as Talos in the superhero film Captain Marvel (2019), reprising the role in Spider-Man: Far From Home (also 2019) and the upcoming Disney+ series Secret Invasion (2023). In 2020, Mendelsohn starred in the HBO crime miniseries The Outsider.

Early life and family
Mendelsohn was born in Melbourne, Victoria, the son of Carole Ann (née Ferguson) and Frederick Arthur Oscar Mendelsohn. His father is a prominent medical researcher who previously headed the Howard Florey Institute in Melbourne, where he maintains the status of Professor Emeritus. Ben and his two brothers, Tom and David, as well as his mother (deceased), a registered nurse, lived in Europe and the United States for long periods of time, and returned to Melbourne when he was in high school. He attended Mercersburg Academy in the U.S. before attending Heidelberg Primary School and Eltham High School and Banyule High (now Viewbank College). He took drama because he thought it was an easy class. Mendelsohn was the only one of his friends to follow up with an audition for Crawford Productions that was being advertised.

In October 2009, he was featured in an episode of the Australian series Who Do You Think You Are?, which traced the ancestry of his paternal grandfather Oscar Mendelsohn, who was from a Jewish family. It also found convicts on his mother's side. Searching for a connection to composer Felix Mendelssohn, which was eventually dismissed, he discovered links to 19th-century Prussia. His paternal ancestors were among the first Prussian Jews to be naturalised in Schneidemühl in the province of Posen, now Piła in modern Poland. He also has Greek, German, and British Isles ancestry.

Career

After several early television roles, including The Henderson Kids alongside Kylie Minogue, he attracted notice in his breakout film, The Year My Voice Broke (1987), and won the Australian Film Institute Award for Best Supporting Actor. His next major role was in The Big Steal (1990), and Spotswood (1992), co-starring with Anthony Hopkins; this was followed in 1994 by Metal Skin and in 1996 by Cosi and Idiot Box. In 2000, he was in two contrasting films, the Australian Mullet and the Hollywood Vertical Limit.

In 2005, he was preparing to play Mark Antony in the Sydney Theatre Company-produced Julius Caesar, and he was in the Terrence Malick-directed film The New World.

Mendelsohn starred in the second (2005) and third (2006) season of the TV series Love My Way, and in 2008, he appeared in Baz Luhrmann's Australia. He starred in the first season of the Melbourne TV series Tangle, which premiered on Showcase in 2009. In 2009, he appeared in the American science fiction film Knowing directed by Alex Proyas. The same year, Mendelsohn starred as Ned in Beautiful Kate, directed by Rachel Ward, opposite Bryan Brown and Rachel Griffiths.

In 2010, he appeared in Animal Kingdom, starring in the film as Andrew "Pope" Cody, a criminal on the run from the law living in the notorious Melbourne Underworld. The role won him many awards, including IF Award's Best Actor and the AFI's award for Best Actor in a Leading Role. He was also named by GQ Australia as Actor of the Year for 2010.

Mendelsohn was selected as one of the subjects in the Who's Who in Australia 2012 edition. In 2012, Mendelsohn played the supporting roles of John Daggett in Christopher Nolan's The Dark Knight Rises and Robin Van Der Hook in Derek Cianfrance's The Place Beyond the Pines.

In 2012, he appeared in Florence + the Machine's music video for "Lover to Lover". The video was directed by Vincent Haycock. In 2013, he guest starred in the TV series Girls as the father of Jessa, played by Jemima Kirke. The following year, he appeared in the critically acclaimed Starred Up, directed by David MacKenzie, for which he won Best Supporting Actor at the British Independent Film Awards.

In 2014, Mendelsohn joined the cast of Bloodline, a Netflix original from the creators of Damages. The first season premiered on the site on 20 March 2015 and was well received. Mendelsohn's performance on the series was lauded by critics, resulting in a Primetime Emmy Award win as well as a Golden Globe Award nomination. In September 2016, Netflix announced that the show had been cancelled, and that it would end after its third season in 2017. Season 3 of Bloodline received negative reviews, and Mendelsohn appeared in two episodes of it.

In 2016, he appeared in video as an onstage "stand-in" during the Nostalgic For the Present concert tour of Australian singer Sia, for her song "Breathe Me".

He portrayed the villain Director Krennic in the Star Wars franchise's Rogue One in 2016. He called the opportunity to act in a Star Wars film "a childhood dream come true". A couple of years later in 2018, he played the role of Nolan Sorrento in Steven Spielberg's science fiction film Ready Player One. In 2018, he starred in the film The Land of Steady Habits. He was cast in the role of Talos in Marvel's film Captain Marvel alongside Samuel L. Jackson and Brie Larson. He reprised the role for a brief cameo in Spider-Man: Far From Home, also in 2019.

In 2020, Mendelsohn starred in the lead role in the HBO crime miniseries The Outsider. In December 2020, it was announced he would be reprising his role as Talos, along with Samuel L. Jackson as Nick Fury, in the upcoming Disney+ series Secret Invasion.

Depictions in art
While filming Adoration, Mendelsohn posed for portrait artist Sally West.

Personal life
Mendelsohn married British-American journalist Emma Forrest in June 2012. He has a daughter with Forrest, born in 2014, and another daughter from a previous relationship, who is also an actor. He and Forrest divorced in 2016.

He is a fan of video games, and cites The Last of Us as his favorite.

Filmography

Music

Awards and nominations

References

Further reading
 Romei, Stephen. (2005). "The Face: Stephen Romei meets Ben Mendelsohn (actor)". Review liftout, p. 3, The Weekend Australian, 25–26 June 2005

External links

 

1969 births
20th-century Australian male actors
21st-century Australian male actors
Australian male child actors
Australian people of British descent
Australian people of German descent
Australian people of German-Jewish descent
Australian people of Greek descent
Best Actor AACTA Award winners
Best Supporting Actor AACTA Award winners
Jewish Australian male actors
Living people
Male actors from Melbourne
Outstanding Performance by a Supporting Actor in a Drama Series Primetime Emmy Award winners